The Current is the official newspaper of Nova Southeastern University, founded in 1989 as The Knight. The newspaper has been independent of Nova Southeastern University since its founding and is run by students. However, several prominent publishers, journalists, faculty, and staff members act as advisers and assist in syndicating stories across larger mediums. The newspaper is published weekly during the semester on Tuesdays. In 2004, The Current launched a new, full service website.

External links
Official website

Nova Southeastern University
Student newspapers published in Florida